Nolan McKenzie (born 10 May 1969) is a Guyanese cricketer. He played in 19 first-class and 14 List A matches for Guyana from 1988 to 1996.

See also
 List of Guyanese representative cricketers

References

External links
 

1969 births
Living people
Guyanese cricketers
Guyana cricketers
Sportspeople from Georgetown, Guyana